Barbados Sky is the first and only LP released by Typically Tropical, released in 1975. It was most famous for its hit single "Barbados". The musicians included top session players Chris Spedding, Roger Coulam, Vic Flick, Joe Moretti, Clem Cattini and Alan Caddy.

Track listing
Side 1
 "Barbados" (Jeffrey Calvert, Max West)
 "Hot Summer Girls" (Peter Shelley, Marty Wilde)
 "The Pied Piper" (Artie Kornfeld, Steve Duboff)
 "Hole In the Sky" (Calvert, West)
 "In the Stew" (Calvert)
 "Sylvan's a Barbadian" (Calvert, West)
Side 2
 "Sandy" (Calvert, West)
 "Everybody Plays the Fool" (Rudy Clark, Ken Williams, J.R. Bailey)
 "Rocket Now" (Calvert, West)
 "Israelites" (Desmond Dacres, Leslie Kong)
 "Do the Yam" (West, Chris Tsangarides)

Personnel
The Hurricane Force Steel Band
Tobias Wilcock - vocals
Chris Spedding, Joe Moretti, Kevin Peek, Vic Flick - guitar
Alan Tarney, Dave Marquee - bass
Jeffrey Calvert - vocals, producer, engineer
Max West - keyboards, arrangements, producer
Roger Coulam - keyboards
Clem Cattini, Trevor Spencer - drums
Frank Ricotti - percussion
Technical
Lindsay Kidd, Martin Levan, Robin Black - engineer
Chris "Yam" Tsangarides - tape op "tapes and insanity"
Gull Graphics, John Pasche - sleeve design

References

External links 
[ Typically Tropical biography] at Allmusic website
https://www.discogs.com/Typically-Tropical-Barbados-Sky/release/2484169

1975 debut albums
Albums recorded at Morgan Sound Studios